Tom Dresser  (1891 – 9 April 1982) was an English recipient of the Victoria Cross, the highest and most prestigious award for gallantry in the face of the enemy that can be awarded to British and Commonwealth forces.

Dresser was born at Laund House Farm, Huby in 1891. He was 25 years old, and a private in the 7th Battalion, The Yorkshire Regiment (Alexandra, Princess of Wales's Own), British Army during the First World War when the following deed took place for which he was awarded the VC.

On 12 May 1917 near Roeux, France, Private Dresser, in spite of having been twice wounded on the way and suffering great pain, succeeded in conveying an important message from battalion headquarters to the front line trenches, which he eventually reached in an exhausted condition. His fearlessness and determination to deliver this message at all costs proved of the greatest value to his battalion at a critical period.

His Victoria Cross is displayed at the Green Howards Museum in Richmond, North Yorkshire.

References

Location of grave and VC medal (Cleveland)

1890s births
1982 deaths
Green Howards soldiers
British Army personnel of World War I
British World War I recipients of the Victoria Cross
People from Hambleton District
British Home Guard soldiers
Machine Gun Corps soldiers
British Army recipients of the Victoria Cross
Military personnel from Yorkshire
Burials in North Yorkshire